General elections were held in the Turks and Caicos Islands on 4 March 1999. The result was a victory for the ruling People's Democratic Movement (PDM), which won nine of the thirteen seats in the Legislative Council. PDM leader Derek Hugh Taylor remained Chief Minister.

Electoral system
The thirteen members of the Legislative Council were elected from single-member constituencies.

Campaign
A total of 38 candidates contested the elections; the Progressive National Party (PNP) and PDM both ran full slates of 13 candidates, with an additional twelve candidates running as independents.

Results

References

Elections in the Turks and Caicos Islands
Turks
General election
March 1999 events in North America
Turks